Baqal (also Romanized as Baqāl and Boqāl; also known as Bi Aghol and Bi ‘Aqal) is a village in Zohan Rural District, Zohan District, Zirkuh County, South Khorasan Province, Iran. At the 2006 census, its population was 181, in 50 families.

References 

Populated places in Zirkuh County